Justus Haucap (born in Quakenbrück on March 24, 1969) is a German economist who currently works as Professor of Economics at the University of Düsseldorf, where he directs the Düsseldorf Institute for Competition Economics (DICE). The focus of his research is on competition and antitrust as well as the regulation of network industries and the digital economy. In 2015, Haucap was awarded the Gustav Stolper Prize for his contributions to competition policy in Germany.

Early life and education 
A native of Quakenbrück, Justus Haucap studied economics at the University of Saarland and at the University of Michigan, Ann Arbor, obtaining a diploma and Ph.D. from the former in 1993 and 1997. In 2003, Haucap habilitated at the Helmut Schmidt University with a thesis on the application of economic policy to competition, regulation and institutions.

Career 
Haucap worked as Professor for Competition Theory and Policy at the Ruhr University Bochum (2004–07) and later as Professor for Economic Policy at the University of Erlangen-Nuremberg (2007–09). Since 2009, he has been Professor for Competition Theory and Policy at the University of Düsseldorf and Director of the Düsseldorf Institute for Competition Economics (DICE). Moreover, he has been a long-term member and chaired the German Monopoly Commission (2006–14), which advises the German government on competition policy.

Research
Haucap's research focuses on competition and antitrust as well as the regulation of network industries and the digital economy. According to IDEAS/RePEc, he belongs to the top 2% of economists ranked by research output. Key findings of his research include:
 Firms' innovation incentives are largest when an industry union sets a uniform wage rate for all firms, lower if wages are determined at the firm-level and lowest if one union sets individual wages for all firms, thus suggesting that decentralising unionisation structures or imposing non-discrimination rules on wage-setting could spur innovation (with Christian Wey).
 If the introduction of mobile number portability not only abolishes operator switching costs but also makes consumers unable to distinguish between networks with different termination rates and thus allows operators to increase termination rates, then its net effect on consumers' welfare becomes ambiguous (with Stefan Bühler).

Other activities 
 Bruegel, Member of the Scientific Council
 Cologne Institute for Economic Research (IW), Member of the Research Advisory Council
 Herbert Giersch Stiftung, Member of the Advisory Board
 Scientific Institute for Infrastructure und Communications Services (WIK), Member of the Scientific Advisory Board
 North Rhine-Westphalian Academy of Sciences, Humanities and the Arts, Member (since 2014)
 German Academy of Science and Engineering (Acatech), Member (since 2013)
 Fazit-Stiftung, Member of the Board of Trustees (–2022)

Controversy 
In 2022, news media reported critically about payments made by Uber to prominent academics and highlighted Haucap’s role. Haucap had agreed to produce a study on “consumer benefits from a liberalisation of the German taxi market”, in collaboration with a consultancy arm of the German Institute for Economic Research (DIW), for what a news leak suggested was a fee of €48,000 plus VAT. Haucap launched the report at events for influencers and politicians in Berlin.

Selected publications

 Schmidt, I., Haucap, J. (2013). Wettbewerbspolitik und Kartellrecht: Eine interdisziplinäre Einführung. Berlin: Walter de Gruyter.

References

External links

 Profile of Justus Haucap on the website of the University of Düsseldorf
 Google Scholar profile of Justus Haucap

People from Quakenbrück
1969 births
German economists
Academic staff of Heinrich Heine University Düsseldorf
Living people
Helmut Schmidt University alumni
University of Michigan alumni